Budi Karya Sumadi (born 18 December 1956) is an Indonesian architect who currently serves as the Minister of Transportation in Joko Widodo's Working Cabinet.

Born and raised in Palembang, Sumadi studied architecture at Gadjah Mada University before working for state-owned property companies, eventually becoming CEO and was transferred to Angkasa Pura. He was eventually appointed as minister in 2016.

Background
Sumadi was born in Palembang, South Sumatra on 18 December 1956. His father was a civil servant and his mother worked as a kindergarten teacher, in addition to being member of South Sumatra's provincial council between 1956 and 1959. Sumadi completed his first 12 years of education in Palembang, before moving to Yogyakarta to study architecture at Gadjah Mada University, from which he graduated in 1981.

He is married and has one child.

Career
After getting his bachelors, Sumadi began to work as a planning architect for PT Pembangunan Jaya Ancol Tbk, a company owned by the Jakarta city government, in 1982. He worked there for 22 years, rising up through its ranks and becoming its CEO by 2004. He then moved to another Jakarta-owned company PT Jakarta Propertindo, where he was the CEO until 2015. During his time in the companies, he worked in various projects involving housing and infrastructure in Jakarta, including developing the Bintaro Jaya area and constructing low-cost tenements. 

In 2015, Sumadi was transferred to Angkasa Pura II – a central-government owned company which managed airports in western Indonesia. As CEO of AP II, he took on the project of developing Soekarno-Hatta International Airport Terminal 3. Still in 2015, he went into dispute with then-Transport Minister Ignasius Jonan when he refused to remove Soekarno-Hatta International Airport's general manager following a ground handling error by Lion Air, and later disputed again regarding the opening of Terminal 3, where Jonan believed that the terminal was not ready yet.

Minister
Sumadi was appointed as the Minister of Transportation to replace Ignasius Jonan during a cabinet reshuffle on 27 July 2016. Two months into being sworn in, Sumadi released a ministerial regulation for online transportation companies such as Go-Jek, Grab and Uber – covering licensing and regulation of drivers and vehicles, in addition to banning the use of cars with less than 1,300 cc capacity –  which received backlash and resulted in demonstrations by the online transportation drivers. In 2018, he further required Go-Jek and Grab to register officially as transport businesses.

He was investigated by the Corruption Eradication Commission in October 2017 following the arrest of the naval transport director-general. He had previously publicly apologized in August immediately after the arrest.

Following the October 2018 crash of Lion Air flight 610, Sumadi suspended Lion Air's technical director. In accordance to a presidential order, Sumadi also conducted a review of airfares, particularly for low-cost carriers. He also promised to impose sanctions on the airline following the completion of the investigation. Sumadi had previously issued a warning to Lion Air's management to revamp its safety and scheduling in 2017 following several non-fatal incidents.

Personal life
Budi plays table tennis as a hobby, and remarked that he plays it for 15–30 minutes every morning. He also plays in a band with other ministers in the cabinet, dubbed "Elek Yo Band", where he plays the acoustic guitar and provides vocals.

On 14 March 2020, during the COVID-19 pandemic in Indonesia, he tested positive for COVID-19. On 17 March the government spokesperson for coronavirus pandemic announced that his health is improving.

References

1956 births
Living people
People from Palembang
Gadjah Mada University alumni
Working Cabinet (Joko Widodo)
Transport ministers of Indonesia
Indonesian Muslims
Indonesian people of Malay descent·
Onward Indonesia Cabinet